A silicide hydride is a mixed anion compound that contains silicide (Si4− or clusters) and hydride (H−) anions. The hydrogen is not bound to silicon in these compounds. These can be classed as interstitial hydrides, Hydrogenated zintl phases, or Zintl phase hydrides. In the related silanides, SiH3− anions or groups occur. Where hydrogen is bonded to the silicon, this is a case of anionic hydride, and where it is bonded to a more complex anion, it would be termed polyanionic hydride.

Silicide hydrides may be prepared by heating a Zintl phase or metal silicide under hydrogen pressure, of perhaps 20 atmospheres.

Properties 
In  CaSiD1+x the deuterium atom (D) fits in a tetrahedral hole between three calcium and one silicon atoms. The Si-D distance is 1.82 Å, quite a bit further than then a Si-H covalent bond.

List

References

Silicides
Hydrides